The greater Chinese mole (Euroscaptor grandis) is a species of mammal in the family Talpidae. It is found in China and potentially Myanmar.

References

Euroscaptor
Taxonomy articles created by Polbot
Mammals of China
Mammals of Myanmar
Mammals described in 1940